The Islamic concept of sovereignty differs from the western principles of international custom and law established by the Treaty of Westphalia.  An important element of this is the Ummah — the community of Muslims as a whole.  Devout Muslims consider that there is no division between religion and politics and so government should be based upon the Qur'an, following the word of God in a unified way, as in the first Caliphate.

References 

Sharia
International law